"The Warrior" is a song by American rock band Scandal featuring Patty Smyth, from the album Warrior, written by Holly Knight and Nick Gilder. The song went to number seven in the United States and number one in Canada, as well as number one on the US Rock Top Tracks chart, and won a BMI Airplay Award in 1984. It was also a hit in Australia, where it peaked at number six, and in New Zealand and South Africa, peaking in both countries at number eleven. The music video for the song was directed by David Hahn.

Charts

Weekly charts

Year-end charts

Certifications

References

1984 singles
1984 songs
Columbia Records singles
RPM Top Singles number-one singles
Scandal (American band) songs
Song recordings produced by Mike Chapman
Songs written by Holly Knight
Songs written by Nick Gilder
Rock ballads